In a Word' may refer to:

In a Word: Yes (1969–)
"In a Word", song by Toto from Toto XX
"In a Word", song by Guy Sebastian from T.R.U.T.H.